Dedh Ishqiya is a 2014 Indian black comedy film directed by Abhishek Chaubey and starring  Arshad Warsi, Naseeruddin Shah, Madhuri Dixit, Huma Qureshi and Vijay Raaz. Produced by Raman Maroo of Shemaroo Entertainment and by Vishal Bharadwaj, it is a sequel of Ishqiya (2010). 

Dedh Ishqiya was released worldwide on 10 January 2014, and proved to be a moderate commercial success at the box office. It received mixed-to-positive reviews from critics upon release. At the 60th Filmfare Awards, Dedh Ishqiya received 5 nominations, including Best Actress (Dixit) and Best Female Playback Singer (Rekha Bhardwaj for "Hamari Atariya Pe").

Plot
Khaalujaan (Naseeruddin Shah) and his nephew Babban (Arshad Warsi), who are partners in crime, pose as a Nawab and his attendant, and manage to run away with a prized necklace from a jewellery shop. During the police chase, they get separated; Babban escapes, Khalujaan is injured, and the necklace seemingly lost. Babban goes to meet his boss Mushtaq Bhai (Salman Shahid), who disbelieves him, accuses him of double-crossing his boss in cahoots with his uncle Khaalujaan, gives him a death sentence, and orders him to dig his own grave. Babban duly begins to dig a grave under supervision, but manages to escape, with the promise that he will bring back both the necklace and Khaalujaan.

Months later, Babban comes across Khalujaan, who is posing as a Nawab and attending a poetry contest. It is a mushaira (gathering of poets) organised by Begum Para (Madhuri Dixit), the widowed Begum of Majidabad, supposedly in compliance with the wishes of her deceased husband. The winner of the poetry contest will not only win the widowed Begum as his bride, and also become the Nawab of Majidabad.

Babban confronts Khalujaan on the opening night of the contest, and tries to get him to return with him. However, Babban himself delays departure after falling in love at first sight with Muniya (Huma Qureshi), Begum Para's beautiful maid and constant companion. Meanwhile, Khalujaan has his task cut out. He needs to fool the gathering into accepting him as an aristocrat of high lineage, win the poetry contest if possible, and seduce the Begum whether or not that happens. One of the other contestants is a local politician and gangster named Jaan Mohammed (Vijay Raaz), who is holding the poet Nawab Italwi (Manoj Pahwa) in captivity, forcing him to write poetry for Jaan to recite at the contest. The contest proceeds; while Khalujaan has his heart set on Begum Para herself, Babban is smitten with Muniya. Khalujaan tries to impress the Begum by gifting her the prized necklace which he had stolen earlier, but on the final day, Begum declares Jaan Mohammed to be the victor. She declares that she will marry Jaan Mohammad and that he will become the new Nawab of Majidabad.

Since the necklace has clearly failed to move the Begum, Khaalujaan decides to see if a gun will serve the purpose better. However, even as he approaches the Begum brandishing his chosen instrument of persuasion, he finds the dowager being hustled away at gunpoint by a masked man. Khalujaan chases them and blocks their way only to discover that the masked man is none other than his nephew Babban. It turns out that the Begum had plotted her own kidnapping in order to extort money from the nawab-elect (Jaan Mohammad). More twists are then revealed: the Begum was nothing but a dancing-girl (courtesan) who had seduced a middle-aged nawab and married him, only to find that the nawab was actually a pauper who supported his lavish way of life by selling his inherited properties and jewels. He also neglected his wife, who (it is very strongly suggested) developed a relationship of intimacy with a sympathetic maid-servant, Muniya.

By the time the nawab died of good living, he had become completely bankrupt and even his palace had been mortgaged to the money-lenders. After his death, the penniless Begum had been helped financially and courted actively by Jaan Mohammad, who was besotted with her. He also wanted the title and status of being the "Nawab of Majidabad." If a mere dancing-girl could marry an aging nawab and swan around being feted and fawned over as Begum of Majidabad, then Jaan Mohammad, of a similar social background, could likewise climb into the same status by marrying the same girl, now a dowager. The Begum was appalled by this idea. Jaan Mohammad is a man of low birth and uncultured mannerisms, a former street-thug turned politician, with an entourage of sycophantic hoodlums. The idea of marrying such a man was repellent to the Begum, who was anyway in love with her maid-servant. Yet, Jaan Mohammad's debt and his persistence leave the Begum with no choice but to announce a competition for her suitors, as a tactic to delay responding to Jaan's advances.

Thus, the mushiara was conceived of an elaborate hoax: the late Nawab had never wanted that his widow should marry someone else, much less that the winner should be recognized as "Nawab of Majidabad." It was the Begum's own idea, the purpose being to snare a rich man and marry him. The Begum did not want to marry Jaan Mohammad, but she wanted his money, therefore she was staging a kidnapping in order to receive a ransom from Jaan Mohammad. She has employed Babban to act as her kidnapper and extort a hefty ransom from Jaan Mohammad, who was expected to pay up because otherwise he would never fulfill his dream of becoming a Nawab.

Babban duly phones Jaan Mohammed (who is by now aware of the Begum's cunning plan) to bring a ransom of Rs. 100 million (100 million rupees, about $2 million in 2014) in cash to the railway station. All four of them (Begum, maid, and the uncle-nephew duo) reach the railway station to collect the money, but find that they are surrounded by Jaan Mohammad's goons. To their good fortune, Nawab Italwi arrives with a police force and cross-firing ensues. Begum and Muniya escape from the situation, leaving Babban and Khalujaan behind to be arrested.

Two months later, the uncle-nephew duo get bail and, as they leave the jail, they are given a letter from Begum and Muniya. It is a cheeky letter of thanks and goodbye from the women, informing the men that they have sold the priceless necklace and used the proceeds to buy a house and settle down in a faraway town whose name they withhold. Uncle and nephew are now exactly at the same situation where they were at the start of all these shenanigans—the movie ends with the duo once again surrounded by Mushtaq Bhai and his gang.

Cast
 Naseeruddin Shah as Ifthekhar alias Khalujan
 Madhuri Dixit as Begum Para
 Arshad Warsi as Razzaq Hussain alias Babban
 Huma Qureshi as Muneera
 Vijay Raaz as Jaan Mohammad 
 Bhuvan Arora as Young Khalu
 Manoj Pahwa as Nawab Italwi
 Ravi Gossain as Liyaakat ali
 Salman Shahid as Mushtak Bhai
 John Vijay as Police Officer

Production

Casting
At a private party held in Mumbai, Shemaroo Entertainment and Vishal Bhardwaj, who had previously produced Ishqiya (2010), announced the sequel with the same cast and crew.
It was later announced that Vidya Balan, the heroine of Ishquiya, would not feature in the sequel. In April 2012, Madhuri Dixit signed on to play the role of Begum Para, the grey character at the center of the film; it was Dixit's first role after moving back to India from the US in November 2011. The two male leads Naseeruddin Shah and Arshad Warsi were retained from the original. The role of supporting actress first was offered to Asin Thottumkal but, she refused to work in a supporting role, and she said in one interview that she thought that the role is not very attractive and therefore she rejected it. Kangana Ranaut then signed Dedh Ishqiya and said she was going to start shooting soon. However, in December 2012 she was dropped, supposedly due to persistent date issues. She was replaced by Huma Qureshi. Arshad Warsi stated that he was paired with Huma and Madhuri was paired opposite Naseeruddin Shah.

Filming
The shooting was initially scheduled to start in September 2012, but was shifted to November, and was further postponed even at that time, due to issues related to Kangana Ranaut's desire for an expansion of her role. Shooting finally began on 27 February 2013, after she was replaced with Huma Qureshi. Mahmudabad palace near Barabanki was spruced up for the shoot. The "First Look" of the film was released on 25 October 2013 and the trailer was released on 8 November 2013.

Madhuri Dixit performed a mujra to the song Apne Karar Mein. The dance was choreographed by Pandit Birju Maharaj.

Soundtrack

The music of the film was composed by Vishal Bhardwaj, and the lyrics of all the songs have been written by Gulzar. The song "Hamari Atariya" was originally sung by Begum Akhtar in the 1950s, and a new version was recorded with the voice of Rekha Bharadwaj.

The first single "Dil Ka Mizaaj Ishqiya" sung by Rahat Fateh Ali Khan was released on 20 November 2013 and the second single track "Horn OK Please" which sung by Honey Singh, Sukhwinder Singh and Anushka Manchanda was released on 11 December 2013.

The full audio album was unveiled by Shemaroo Entertainment Audios on 19 December 2013.

Critical reception 
Anupama Chopra, the Hindustan Times movie critic said, "Dedh Ishqiya is worth watching just for Abhishek Chaubey's ambition. He is not constrained by the demands of the box office." Giving it 5 out of 5 stars, Rediff India's movie critic Raja Sen called Dedh Ishqiya a genuinely smart film.

Taran Adarsh from Bollywood Hungama also gave positive review, Ishqiya was sharp, spicy and volatile, with impulsive characters and a storyline taking a somersault every few minutes. Dedh Ishqiya is no different. It transports you to a diverse world, but like the first part, this one focuses on love and deceit as well. Also, it's far more complex this time around and the truth hits you like a ton of bricks!

Deepanjana Pal from Firstpost praised director Chaubey the most, saying: "Chaubey is two films old and compared to Ishqiya, Dedh Ishqiya is far more elaborate, complicated and ambitious. Like a skipping stone, the film touches upon a variety of genres — action, comedy, romance, social critique — and Chaubey handles them deftly"

In another Firstpost review, Mihir Fadnavis said: Dedh Ishqiya is smarter, funnier, richer and way more gorgeous than its predecessor. If you're a fan of clever lines with terrific actors, great writing, masterful direction and Urdu poetry, Dedh Ishqiya hits your sweet spot. If you don't really give a damn about any of this and just want a fun time at the movies, Dedh Ishqiya is perhaps the most hilarious thriller Bollywood has produced.

There was a few negative reviews as well. Martin D'Souza from Glamsham Editorial gave the film a negative review and a score of 2/5, stating that the film opens on the wrong foot and moves at a very languid pace.

Box office 
Made on a budget of around 370 million including promotions and marketings, Dedh Ishqiya managed to recovered 408 million from the box office. It was considered commercially successful.

Dedh Ishqiya opened with average occupancy, even though it was released on less than 1200 screens. It collected  (30 million) on its opening day. Overseas collection of Dedh Ishqiya was around $525,000 in first weekend.

This effectively ended the theatrical run of the film, because in the third week, Dedh Ishqiya lost almost all its screens to Jai Ho.

Accolades

Notes

References

External links
 

Films about women in India
Films set in Uttar Pradesh
Films shot in Uttar Pradesh
2010s Hindi-language films
Indian LGBT-related films
Indian black comedy films
Indian comedy thriller films
2014 films
Indian sequel films
Indian comedy-drama films
Films scored by Vishal Bhardwaj
Films shot in Lucknow
2014 thriller films